Anastasia Phillips is a Canadian actress known for her work in the film Tammy's Always Dying, and the TV series Lucky 7 and Reign.

Life and career
Phillips was raised in Etobicoke, Ontario, and obtained her bachelor's degree in Fine Arts from the University of British Columbia. In 2008, she appeared as Tabbi in the TV hockey drama MVP. Her credits include the stageplay The Diary of Anne Frank as the title character, other television roles such as Tina on the MTV show Skins, and as Vera Burr in the wartime drama Bomb Girls. She also voiced Lo Ridgemount on the Fresh TV animated series Stoked. In 2010, Phillips was nominated for Gemini Award for her guest role in Murdoch Mysteries.

In 2013, Phillips was cast in the ABC drama series Lucky 7 as Leanne Maxwell. The series was cancelled after two episodes. She later guest starred on The Mentalist, Grey's Anatomy, and had a recurring role on Reign. She starred in films Don't Talk to Irene (2017) with Geena Davis, Ghostland (2018), and Tammy's Always Dying (2019) opposite Felicity Huffman.

Filmography

Film

Television

References

External links 
 

Living people
Actresses from Toronto
Canadian film actresses
Canadian stage actresses
Canadian television actresses
University of British Columbia alumni
1972 births
21st-century Canadian actresses